The Tareelaroi Weir is a weir across the Gwydir River, located in the North West Slopes region of New South Wales, Australia. The principal purpose of the weir is to mitigate the flow of water, especially in times of peak flows. The impounded reservoir is also called the Tareelaroi Weir.

Location and features
The siting of the weir is downriver from the confluence of the Gwydir and Mehi Rivers. In times of major flooding, Tareelaroi Weir can be rendered useless as floodwater simply flows around it on the surrounding floodplain.

When full, Tareelaroi Weir reservoir holds  of water.

Tareelaroi Weir is owned by the State Water Corporation of New South Wales. The reservoir is used for fishing and water-skiing; and is a popular picnic and barbecue location.

References

Dams in New South Wales
North West Slopes
Murray-Darling basin
Weirs